Szlama Ber Winer, nom de guerre Yakov (Ya'akov) Grojanowski (23 September 1911 – ), was a Polish Jew from Izbica Kujawska, who escaped from the Chełmno extermination camp during the Holocaust in German-occupied Poland. Szlamek (the diminutive form of Szlama) is sometimes incorrectly referred to as Szlamek Bajler in literature by the surname of his nephew, Abram Bajler, from Zamość (see postcard). Szlama Ber Winer escaped from the Waldlager work commando at Chełmno, and described in writing the atrocities he witnessed at that extermination camp, not long before his own subsequent murder at the age of 30, in the gas chambers of Bełżec. His deposition is commonly known as the Grojanowski Report.

Life
Szlama Ber (Szlamek) was born in Izbica Kujawska near Koło on 23 September 1911 (or the 10th, in Julian calendar) to a Jewish merchant Iccak Wolf Winer (35 years of age) and Srenca née Laskow, his lawful wife according to birth certificate from the Office of Public Records. They lived in Izbica just north of Chełmno before the Holocaust. It was an area of interwar Poland which had been annexed in 1939 by Nazi Germany as part of the new territory of Reichsgau Wartheland earmarked for complete "Germanization". In 1940 the Nazis created a ghetto in Izbica for 1,000–1,600 Jews. On 12 January 1942 Winer was deported to Chełmno extermination camp, to slave labour with the camp's Sonderkommando. Two days later, the Izbica Ghetto was liquidated through deportations of 900–1,000 others to extermination on 14–15 January 1942. Szlamek was spared but witnessed the death of his own family in the gas vans. He was assigned by the SS to the burial commando. On Monday, 19 January, Szlamek escaped by slipping out of a lorry on the way to the Rzuchów forest subcamp.

The report
 

Szlamek managed to make his way from Chełmno to the Warsaw Ghetto in the General Government part of occupied Poland. He contacted the clandestine Oneg Shabbat group, headed by Emanuel Ringelblum, and gave detailed information about his harrowing experience with the camp's Sonderkommando. He described the entire extermination procedure at Chełmno step-by-step: how the people who arrived were murdered in gas vans; the constant beatings by the SS; how the inside of the vans was cleaned between loads, and how the bodies were buried in deep dug-out mass graves. Szlamek also described the brutal treatment of prisoners forced to deal with the dead, and his escape from the camp. Winer wrote the Grojanowski Report on the request of Oneg Shabbat who sent its Polish version to the Delegatura (the underground representatives of the Polish government-in-exile), while the German copy was produced for the German people in the hope that it would evoke more compassion for the Jews in them.

A few days after writing this last communiqué, around the 10th of April 1942, he was apprehended together with members of his extended family, and deported to the Bełżec extermination camp along with some 3,000 Jews of the Zamość Ghetto, marched from the market place to the awaiting Holocaust trains at the station. Two weeks later, the 14-year-old nephew of Szlama Winer, Abram Bajler, wrote a postcard from Zamość to Warsaw – sent on 24 April 1942 – after the deportation of his own uncle to the death camp. The message reads:

See also
 Jewish ghettos in German-occupied Poland
 The Holocaust in Poland

Notes

References
 Patricia Heberer,  Children During the Holocaust (Google Books) 
  Bajler (Blajer, misspelling), Szlamek ARC Roll of Remembrance
 Lance Ackerfeld,  Emanuel Ringelblum: The Terrible Choice Yizkor Book Project

Chełmno extermination camp survivors
People who died in Belzec extermination camp
Warsaw Ghetto inmates
Polish people executed in Nazi concentration camps
1911 births
1942 deaths
People from Włocławek County
People from Warsaw Governorate
Jews from the Russian Empire
Polish Jews who died in the Holocaust
Sonderkommando
Jewish Polish writers
Jewish escapees from Nazi concentration camps